Falköpings FK is a Swedish football club located in Falköping in Västra Götaland County.

Background
Falköpings Fotbollsklubb was formed in 1989 when Falköpings BK, Falköpings AIK and BK Rapid decided to merge into a single club under the name FFR. The name Falköpings FK appeared a year later in 1990. Key aims within the club's mission statement are:

 to welcome to FFK anyone who wants to play football;
 to provide any FFK players with the opportunity to develop as footballers;
 that the business is undertaken in a positive spirit; and
 that FFK distances themselves from drugs.

Since their foundation Falköpings FK has participated mainly in the middle and lower divisions of the Swedish football league system.  The club currently plays in Division 4 Västergötland which is the sixth tier of Swedish football. They play their home matches at the Odenplan in Falköping.

Falköpings FK are affiliated to Västergötlands Fotbollförbund.

Recent history
In recent seasons Falköpings FK have competed in the following divisions:

2021 – Division V, Västergötland Mellersta
2020 – Division IV, Västergötland Norra
2019 – Division IV, Västergötland Norra
2018 – Division IV, Västergötland Norra
2017 – Division IV, Västergötland Norra
2016 – Division IV, Västergötland Norra
2015 – Division IV, Västergötland Norra
2014 – Division IV, Västergötland Norra
2013 – Division IV, Västergötland Norra
2012 – Division IV, Västergötland Norra
2011 – Division III, Mellersta Götaland
2010 – Division IV, Västergötland Norra
2009 – Division IV, Västergötland Norra
2008 – Division IV, Västergötland Norra
2007 – Division IV, Västergötland Norra
2006 – Division IV, Västergötland Norra
2005 – Division V, Västergötland Östra
2004 – Division IV, Västergötland Norra
2003 – Division IV, Västergötland Norra
2002 – Division IV, Västergötland Norra
2001 – Division V, Västergötland Östra
2000 – Division V, Södra Skaraborg
1999 – Division V, Södra Skaraborg

Attendances

In recent seasons Falköpings FK have had the following average attendances:

Footnotes

External links
 Falköpings FK – Official website
 Falköpings FK on Facebook

Football clubs in Västra Götaland County
Association football clubs established in 1989
1989 establishments in Sweden